The 2010–11 season was ACF Fiorentina's 85th season in Italian football and their 73rd season in the first-tier, Serie A. This was also the sixth consecutive season for the club in the top-level division of the Italian football league system.

After five seasons at the helm of the Tuscan club, Cesare Prandelli was succeeded by Siniša Mihajlović, with the former taking the role as head coach of the Italian national team. For Fiorentina, this was also the first season from the last three that Fiorentina did not compete in a European competition, after finishing 11th the previous season.

Players

Squad information
Last updated on 22 May 2011
Appearances include league matches only

Transfers

In

Total spending:  ~€17.1 million

Out

Total income:  ~€1.3 million

Pre-season and friendlies

Competitions

Overall

Serie A

League table

Results summary

Results by round

Matches

Coppa Italia

Statistics

Appearances and goals

Goalscorers

References

ACF Fiorentina seasons
Fiorentina